Barbara Walsh (born June 3, 1955) is an American musical theatre actress who has appeared in several prominent Broadway productions. Walsh is known for her Drama Desk Award and Tony Award nominated role as Trina in the original Broadway production of Falsettos, as well as her turn as Joanne in the 2006 Broadway Revival of Stephen Sondheim's musical Company.

Early life
Walsh grew up with seven siblings in Chevy Chase, Maryland. Skilled at singing and performing impressions from a young age, she began performing in theater during high school. She attended Georgetown Visitation, an all-girls Catholic high school, and began performing in musicals at a local boys' high school. She then attended Montgomery College, where she studied drama and music. After college, Walsh worked in dinner theatre and summer stock in Warsaw, Indiana. Her voice teacher of 30 years was Margaret Riddleberger.

Career
Walsh is known for her role as Trina in the Tony Award-winning original Broadway production of William Finn and James Lapine's Falsettos (1992). She first performed in the role in the production directed by Graciela Daniele at the Hartford Stage in Connecticut in 1990, the first staging of March of the Falsettos and Falsettoland as a single show. She then remained in the role when Falsettos went to Broadway. She received a Tony Award nomination, a Drama Desk Award nomination, and a Los Angeles Ovation Award for the role. She later reprised this role for the show's national tour in 1994.

Walsh previously made her Broadway debut in 1982 in the cast of musical revue Rock 'N Roll! The First 5,000 Years. She then appeared in Nine as Francesca. She also appeared on Broadway in 1993 in Blood Brothers, originating the role of Mrs. Lyons. In 1996, Walsh played Mrs. Baskin in the original production of Big. In 2002, she took over the role of Velma Von Tussle in the Broadway production of Hairspray. She played Joanne in the 2006 Tony Award-winning Broadway revival of Stephen Sondheim's Company, for which she received a Drama Desk Award nomination. This production was taped for television and aired on PBS in February 2008.

Walsh performed Off-Broadway in Forbidden Broadway in the mid-1980s, parodying figures such as Barbra Streisand and Bernadette Peters. Her other Off-Broadway credits include Birds of Paradise (1987), Stars in Your Eyes (1999), the Transport Group's Jonathan Larson Award-winning musical Normal (2005), and Transport Group's Three Days to See (2015). Later in 2015, she appeared in Michael John LaChiusa's First Daughter Suite at The Public Theater, playing the role of Pat Nixon.

Walsh's other work includes national touring productions of Oklahoma!, Les Misérables, the 1990 US tour of Chess, for which her performance as Svetlana earned her a Carbonell Award, and the 1984 national tour of Nine, in which she reprised her role as Francesca from the Broadway production.

Regionally, Walsh has been seen in Houdini in 1997 and Exactly Like You in 1998 at Goodspeed Opera House in Connecticut. She starred in Gretna Theatre's 1997 production of A Streetcar Named Desire as Blanche DuBois. Walsh replaced Donna Bullock in the role of Mother in the Chicago cast of Ragtime in 1998. She played Pfeni Rosensweig in the Wendy Wasserstein play The Sisters Rosensweig at New Jersey's George Street Playhouse in 2002. In 2006, Walsh played Joanne in John Doyle's production of Company at Cincinnati Playhouse in the Park, a role she reprised when the production later transferred to Broadway. She appeared in A Little Night Music in 2008 as Desirée Armfeldt at Center Stage in Baltimore. She played the dual roles of Edith Beale and her daughter Little Edie in Grey Gardens in 2008 at the Studio Theatre in Washington, D.C. In 2009 she played Maria Callas in Paper Mill Playhouse's Master Class. She was cast in First Wives Club at the Old Globe Theatre in 2009. She performed in Capital Repertory Theatre's 33 Variations in 2010. She starred in George Street Playhouse's 2010 production of Creating Claire. She played Sonia in Center Stage's 2014 production of Vanya and Sonia and Masha and Spike. In 2014, she played Margaret White in Studio 2ndStage's Carrie: the Musical, a role for which she won a Helen Hayes Award. In April 2016, it was announced that Walsh would join the cast of new musical Presto Change-O as part of Barrington Stage Company's 2016 season. Presto Change-O opened May 18, 2016, with Walsh playing the role of Mary. In August 2016, Walsh joined Gloucester Stage Company's production of Songs for a New World. In March 2017, Walsh portrayed Eliza Hamilton and Hillary Clinton in the Mohammed Fairouz opera The New Prince at the Dutch National Opera in Amsterdam. She played Hannah Pitt and others in the Actors Theatre of Louisville's October 2017 production of Angels in America.

Walsh's television credits include multiple guest appearances on Law & Order and Law & Order: Criminal Intent, as well as the re-occurring role of Judy Schulman-Brown on One Life to Live. Walsh also appeared in the film Life with Mikey.

Personal life
Walsh is married to Jack Cummings III, the artistic director of Transport Group Theatre Company.

References

External links

Internet Off-Broadway Database listing
"2006 DIVA TALK: In Good Company: Chatting with Barbara Walsh", Andrew GansPlaybill, December 15, 2006
Barbara Walsh Downstage Center interview at American Theatre Wing, January 2007

1955 births
Living people
Actresses from Maryland
American musical theatre actresses
American television actresses
Drama Desk Award winners
Place of birth missing (living people)
Montgomery College alumni
21st-century American women